Oleksiy Fedorovych Fedorov (Aleksey Fyodorovich Fyodorov; 30 March 1901 – 9 September 1989), was one of the leaders of Soviet partisan movement during World War II. He was twice awarded the title Hero of the Soviet Union, making him one of the only two partisan leaders to receive the title twice (the other being fellow Ukrainian Sydir Kovpak).

Biography 
Oleksiy Fedorov was born in Lotsmanska Kamianka (today part of Dnipro) in a Ukrainian peasant family. In 1920 he joined the Red Army and fought in the Russian Civil War.

In 1927 he joined Communist Party of the Soviet Union and by 1938 became a first secretary of the regional party committee in Chernihiv Oblast.

After the Nazi Germany invasion of the Soviet Union, Fedorov became a prominent organizer of the underground resistance in occupied Ukraine. During the winter of 1941-1942 he commanded Chernigov partisan unit which by March 1942 had sixteen engagements with the enemy and killed over a thousand German troops. In May 1942 Oleksiy Fedorov was awarded a title Hero of the Soviet Union and the Order of Lenin with a golden star. During the spring and summer of 1943 Fedorov's partisan units expanded guerrilla activities into other occupied regions of USSR outside north-east Ukraine including the Volyn, Belarus, Bryansk and Oryol regions. During the legendary Kovel railway hub operation in the autumn of 1943 and the following winter, the partisans of Fedorov liquidated over 500 German supply trains full of ammunition, fuel, military equipment and army personnel.

Partisan forces under his command committed at least one massacre of alleged collaborators. They annihilated the village of Liakhovychi in response to what they believed was collaboration. An eyewitness recounted that they 'killed everyone they spotted', including women, children and whole families. 

Oleksiy Fedorov was promoted to the rank of major general and in January 1944 awarded a second Gold Star medal.

Civilian life 
After the liberation of Ukraine, Oleksiy Fedorov headed Communist party committees in several Ukrainian regions including Kherson (1944–1949) Izmail (1950–1952) and Zhytomyr (1952–1957) oblasts. In 1957 he became a Minister of Welfare in the government of Ukrainian SSR and until 1979 he served as a deputy of the Supreme Soviet of the USSR.
 
Oleksiy Fedorov died on September 9, 1989 in Kyiv, a monument was built to honour partisan hero of anti-Nazi struggle in his native Dnipropetrovsk.

Awards 
 Twice Hero of the Soviet Union (1942 and 1944)
 Six Orders of Lenin (1939, 1942, 1961, 1981)
 Order of Suvorov 1st class (1945)
 Order of Bogdan Khmelnitsky 1st class (1944)
 Order of the Red Banner
 Order of the Patriotic War 1st class (1945)
 Order of the Patriotic War 2nd class (1945)
 Order of the Red Star
 Order of the October Revolution
 Order of the Red Banner of Labour
 Medal "Partisan of the Patriotic War" 1st class
 Medal "For the Victory over Germany in the Great Patriotic War 1941–1945"

References

External links
 Fyodorov in wartime, photo by Yakov Davidson, Photo Archive, Ghetto Fighters' House
War Hero Aleksey Fyodorov - in Russian.
Фёдоров Алексей Фёдорович. www.knowbysight.info

1901 births
1989 deaths
Military personnel from Dnipro
Burials at Baikove Cemetery
Heroes of the Soviet Union
Soviet military personnel of World War II
Ukrainian people of World War II
Soviet partisans in Ukraine
Soviet major generals
Communist Party of the Soviet Union members
Central Committee of the Communist Party of Ukraine (Soviet Union) members
Recipients of the Order of Suvorov, 1st class
Recipients of the Order of Bogdan Khmelnitsky (Soviet Union), 1st class
First secretaries in non-national subdivisions of the Soviet Union
First convocation members of the Verkhovna Rada of the Ukrainian Soviet Socialist Republic
Second convocation members of the Verkhovna Rada of the Ukrainian Soviet Socialist Republic
Third convocation members of the Verkhovna Rada of the Ukrainian Soviet Socialist Republic
Fourth convocation members of the Verkhovna Rada of the Ukrainian Soviet Socialist Republic
Fifth convocation members of the Verkhovna Rada of the Ukrainian Soviet Socialist Republic
Sixth convocation members of the Verkhovna Rada of the Ukrainian Soviet Socialist Republic
Social policy ministers of Ukraine
Ukrainian anti-fascists